FIYM is the first extended play by American pop boy band Forever in Your Mind. It was released on July 1, 2016, through Hollywood Records, and was preceded by its lead single, "Hurricane", and second single "Enough About Me".

Background
Following the band's creation in 2013 from a group of contestants on The X-Factor, Forever in Your Mind released several pop singles, such as "Sweet Little Something", before signing with Hollywood Records in November 2015. As artists signed to a record label of the Disney Music Group, members Liam Attridge, Ricky Garcia, and Emery Kelly cultivated the band's pop music style by recording medleys of tracks from popular Disney Channel movies and covers of contemporary chart-toppers, like Taylor Swift's "Wildest Dreams".

Shortly after announcing that the band would sign onto the record label, Garcia indicated that the band was excited to "officially" make music for its fans. Forever in Your Mind promoted the eponymous debut EP with the release of two singles prior to the release of FIYM itself in July 2016.

Composition
FIYM is largely a pop music production, with lyrical and compositional tendencies toward the teen pop subgenre. Just as the debut EP of fellow Hollywood labelmate and Disney Channel actress Olivia Holt featured a diverse range of musical influences from track to track, the four tracks that comprise FIYM draw influences from several genres. Lead single ″Hurricane″ offers a rock-tinged sound, while the chorus of second single ″Enough About Me″ features disco roots. Third single ″Compass″ also provides a unique, folk-esque sound to the EP. AllMusic lists the EP's genre as ″pop/rock″

Promotion

Performances
Forever in Your Mind has performed tracks from FIYM throughout 2016 to promote the EP. On July 4, 2016, the band performed Hurricane on ABC's Good Morning America. Later that year, Forever in Your Mind played its first major headlining show at the iconic Roxy Theatre, performing "Enough About Me" and "Whistle" in addition to "Hurricane". The band also filmed a mini-series entitled "Road to the Roxy" to document their experiences leading up to the gig. The band joined labelmate Olivia Holt on her Rise of a Phoenix Tour as a supporting act, along with Ryland Lynch and Isac Elliot.

Singles
"Hurricane" was confirmed as the lead single from the EP and released on April 29, 2016. The music video, which shows the boys throwing a party in an abandoned house in the desert during a storm, was released on May 7.

"Enough About Me" was released as the second single on June 30, 2016, the same day as the music video release. The video features a battle between the boys and three girls in a high school, in which both sides trade dares for one another to perform.

"Compass" was released on December 30, 2016, as the final single from FIYM. Its accompanying music video, which shows the boys walking along a trail up a mountain while singing, was released on the same day.

Track listing

Personnel
Liam Attridge – vocals
Ricky Garcia – vocals
Emery Kelly – vocals

Charts

Release history

References

2016 albums
Hollywood Records albums